John Southworth (c. 1526 – 3 November 1595), of Samlesbury, Lancashire, was an English politician.

He was a Member (MP) of the Parliament of England for Lancashire in 1563.

References

1526 births
1595 deaths
English MPs 1563–1567
Members of the Parliament of England (pre-1707) for Lancashire